Sriraj Ginne is a progressive story writer, play-wright and film script writer in Telugu. His stories have been translated into various Indian languages. Sriraj has given expression to various aspects of the realities of middle-class life in his stories. Through his impressive stories, he  portrayed the genesis of anomalies  of the converted society. The positive consciousness of living  is easily visible in his work.

In these stories, Sriraj unfolds his time and many layers of society with sensitivity to the readers. He says that the complexity of life, stress, frustration, and the rapidly changing scenario in which withstand the pain of ecstatic mindset and living in a comfortable way with sensitivity. As a person of a middle class, Sriraj has made an honest and meaningful effort to write on different aspects of the mindset of that class on the changes in the person, society and group level in that class. The artistic disorder is a feature of his storytelling. His story-crafts follow his ideological vision and also express his sympathies. His stories hold a very special place in the contemporary Telugu story literature with regard to sensation and crafts.

Background
Sriraj  the writer, who likes the style of the authors Ravi Sastri and Robert Browning, was born on 22 November,  in Visakhapatnam (Malkapuram, Andhra Pradesh, India). Mrs. Seshamma and Sri Rajalingam are the parents of the writer. Wife Mrs. Satya Parvathi Devi is a home maker while three children (one boy and two girls) have settled in America. He studied B.Sc., in A.V.N. College, Diploma in Theater Arts (Play Direction) in Andhra University, Visakhapatnam. He currently resides in Visakhapatnam as a retired employee of BSNL (Central Government).

He has written the first story for the magazine in the days of high school. About sixty short stories and some poems have been published in leading weekly and monthly magazines and special editions. Some of these stories have been translated into Hindi, Kannada, Oriya, and English. Story collections have emerged: Okka kshanam (1983), Chukkala Seema (1985), Velugu Vaakitloki (2003), Ujala Ki Orr (Hindi Translation 2018), The Lost Case (Short Story).

For theatrical performance and All India Radio, he has written about 40 plays/playlets some of which are Lancham, Kaladharmam, Karmasakshi, Sandhyaragam, Athaniki Atoo Itoo, etc. The play Kaladharmam, won the best awards in many Parishats at the State / National level has been staged at All India Telugu Conference,  Bangalore on 11 March 1990. He has written for Television scripts such as Sneha 13 episodes (ETV Telugu Channel), RagamMarinaPata (Doordarshan), Vaalupoddu (Saptagiri Channel)

As a film writer, he has written for films such as Kalikalam, Surigadu, Preminchu, Mamaa Kodalu, Akka Bagunnava, etc. Received 2002 Golden  Nandi Award of Andhra Pradesh Government for Preminchu movie. Suragadu Cinema has been selected for the China Film Festival and Indian Panorama. Surigadu was remade into a Hindi movie "Santaan". Kalikalam movie on the basis of Kaladharmam has been reproduced into Indian languages : Tamil, Kannada, Oriya, Bengali and  Marathi.

He has received the prestigious Literary Award ' Telugu Sahithi Puraskaram'  for his play 'Kaladharmam' from Telugu University in the year 1990 and  many awards such as  Madras Kalasagar Awards, Vamsi Berkeley Award, South Indian Film Fans Association Awards.

Filmography
Sriraj is credited with scripts for 15 feature films, 'Kalikaalam', 'Surigadu' (ranked as the best at the Indian panorama 1993 and was selected for China Film Fest in the same year), 'Preminchu' which won AP Bangaru Nandi award in 2001, 'Rajeswari Kalyanam', 'Akka Baagunnava' and the likes. Not only that, the retakes of 'Santhan' in Hindi, 'Kalikaalam' in Tamil, Kannada, Maraathi, Bengali and Oriya and 'Surigadu' in Tamil and Hindi were hits at the box office.

Writer
 Kalikalam (Telugu) : 30 May 1991 - Story
 Surigadu (Telugu) : 17 April 1992 - Dialogue, Story
 Attaku Koduku Mamaku Alludu (Telugu) : 9 January 1993
 Maama-Kodalu (Telugu) : 2 April 1993
 Appalee Manasa (Marathi) : June 1993
 Kumkuma Bhagya (Kannada) : Oct 1993
 Santhaan (Hindi) : 12 November 1993 - Story
 Watchman Vadivelu (Tamil) : 24 July 1994
 Vennela (Telugu) : May 1994
 Antee Choori Thontee Katte (Oriya) : Dec 1993
 Kalikaal (Bengali) : 1993
 Thapassu (Telugu) : 2 February 1995
 Akka Bagunnava (Telugu) : Sep 1997
 Speed Dancer (Telugu) : 17 June 1999
 Rajeswari Kalyanam (Telugu) : 1995
 Preminchu (Telugu) : 11 April 2001 - Story
 Maaji Aayee (Marathi): 2008

Television
 Sneha (13 Episode Serial) - ETV 29 August 1995 to 28 November 1995
 Ragam marina Paata (Single Episode)
 Mandakini (Single Episode)

Books
 Lancham (Playlet)
 Okka Kshanam (Compilation of Short stories)
 Chukkalaseema (Short stories)
 Kaaladharmam (Playlet)
 Velugu Vakitloki (Anthology of Short Stories)
 Happy Father's Day (Short story)

References

Navya Neerajana Weekly Jan ,26 2011 Article

External links
 Felicitation in Visakhapatnam 
 Book Review in THE HINDU, Visakhapatnam 4 May 2004 Tuesday 
 Felicitation by Telecom Kala Sravanthi 

1946 births
Living people
Telugu writers